Atikamekw may refer to:

 Atikamekw language
 Atikamekw people

Language and nationality disambiguation pages